Arnsberg is one of the five Regierungsbezirke of North Rhine-Westphalia, Germany, located in the west-central part of the country. It covers the Sauerland hills as well as the east part of the Ruhr area.

The region was founded in 1815 as a subdivision of the Prussian Province of Westphalia.

Kreise(counties)
 Ennepe-Ruhr
 Hochsauerland
 Märkischer Kreis
 Olpe
 Siegen-Wittgenstein
 Soest
 Unna

Kreisfreie Städte(independent cities)
 Bochum
 Dortmund
 Hagen
 Hamm
 Herne

Economy 
The Gross domestic product (GDP) of the region was 124.8 billion € in 2018, accounting for 3.7% of German economic output. GDP per capita adjusted for purchasing power was 32,000 € or 106% of the EU27 average in the same year. The GDP per employee was 95% of the EU average.

References

External links 

  

NUTS 2 statistical regions of the European Union
Westphalia
Government regions of Prussia
Geography of North Rhine-Westphalia
States and territories established in 1815
1815 establishments in Prussia
Government regions of Germany